was a Japanese actor. Ehara joined Toei Company and began his acting career with"Nagurikomi Nijyuohachinin shu". In 1957, he won Elan d'or Award for Newcomer of the Year.
He died on 27 September 2022, aged 85.

Selected filmography

Film
Jun'ai Monogatari (1957)
The Rice People (1957)
Naked Sun (1957)
Invasion of the Neptune Men (1961) as scientist Yanagida
Miyamoto Musashi: Hannyazaka no kettō (1962) as Seijurō Yoshioka
Bushido, Samurai Saga (1963)
Miyamoto Musashi: Nitōryū kaigen (1963) as Seijurō Yoshioka
Miyamoto Musashi: Ichijōji no kettō (1964) as Seijurō Yoshioka
Jakoman and Tetsu (1964) as Osaka
Wolves, Pigs and Men (1964) as Mizuhara
Blackmail Is My Life (1968)
Outlaw:Kill! (1968)
Sleepy Eyes of Death 12: Castle Menagerie (1969)
Bakumatsu (1970)
Under the Flag of the Rising Sun (1972)
Kage Gari (1972)
 Nichiren (1979)
Edo Jō Tairan (1991) as Ōkubo Tadatomo

Television
Daichūshingura (1971) as Kataoka Gengoemon
Shinsho Taikōki (1973) as Takeda Katsuyori
Naruto Hichō (1977-78) as Magobei
Kusa Moeru (1979) as Kajiwara Kagetoki, Taiga drama
 Fumō Chitai (1979) as Isao Kawamata
Tokugawa Ieyasu (1983) as Ishikawa Kazumasa, Taiga drama
Ōoku (1983) as Yamauchi Igasuke
Kawaite sōrō (1984)
Miyamoto Musashi (1984–85) as Aoki Tanzaemon
Hōjō Tokimune  (2001) as Kō no Morouji, Taiga drama
Kokoro (2003)

References

External links
 
 

1936 births
2022 deaths
20th-century Japanese male actors
Male actors from Kyoto